Transcription elongation factor A protein 2 is a protein that in humans is encoded by the TCEA2 gene.

Function 

The protein encoded by this gene is found in the nucleus, where it functions as an SII class transcription elongation factor. Elongation factors in this class are responsible for releasing RNA polymerase II ternary complexes from transcriptional arrest at template-encoded arresting sites. The encoded protein has been shown to interact with general transcription factor IIB, a basal transcription factor. Two transcript variants encoding different isoforms have been found for this gene.

Interactions 

TCEA2 has been shown to interact with MAGEA11.

References

Further reading